The Kodak DC3200 is a model of digital camera produced by the Eastman Kodak Company in 2000–2002. The camera was connected via a serial cable in order to download pictures. Kodak ceased supporting the model a couple of years later. A PDF file of the manual is available on their site. Although Kodak no longer offer a free download of the necessary software, this might be available elsewhere on the Internet.

However the software is not really necessary, if the optional compact flash storage is used, which can easily be read in an appropriate modern PC card reader.

Image Storage
The camera has 2 MB of internal memory. Memory capacity can be expanded with a CompactFlash card.

Overexposure
A common problem with the DC3200 was that the auto flash was too powerful. Pictures that were taken indoors would often be overexposed.

See also 
 Kodak DC Series

External links
KODAK DC3200 Digital Camera Support
Steve's Digicams User Review
Kodak DSC3200 picture and additional information available the "Antique_Camera_Guy's" Flickr Photostream

DC3200